Viktor Yevgenyevich Shkurat (born 20 August 1984) is a Russian former professional football player.

Club career
He made his debut for FC Rostov on 13 July 2005 in a Russian Cup game against FC Luch-Energiya Vladivostok.

He played 3 seasons in the Russian Football National League for FC SKA Rostov-on-Don and FC MVD Rossii Moscow.

External links
 
 

1984 births
Sportspeople from Rostov-on-Don
Living people
Russian footballers
Association football forwards
Association football midfielders
FC Rostov players
FC Mordovia Saransk players
FC SKA Rostov-on-Don players
FC Tyumen players
FC MVD Rossii Moscow players